Sphallotrichus bidens is a species of beetle in the family Cerambycidae. It was described by Johan Christian Fabricius in 1801. It is known from the Guianas, northwestern Brazil, and Bolivia.

References

Cerambycini
Beetles described in 1801